SS Friedenau was a German cargo steamer sunk during World War II.

SS Friedenau was built in 1920 by Ateliers & Chantiers De La Loire, St. Nazaire as a refrigerated cargo steamer for Cie. Française De Navigation À Vapeur Chargeurs Réunis who named her SS Adrar. In 1937 she was acquired by Bugsier-Reederei and renamed Friedenau. While carrying German mountain troops in support of the German invasion of Norway, SS Friedenau was torpedoed and sunk in the Kattegat by the British submarine HMS Triton on 10 April 1940.

References

Steamships of France
Steamships of Germany
Merchant ships of France
World War II merchant ships of Germany
World War II auxiliary ships of Germany
Ships built in France
1920 ships
Troop ships of Germany
Maritime incidents in April 1940
World War II shipwrecks in the Baltic Sea
Ships sunk by British submarines